Patrik Machač (born April 23, 1994) is a Czech professional ice hockey player. He is currently playing for HC Kladno of the Czech Extraliga.

Machač made his Czech Extraliga debut playing with HC Kladno during the 2013–14 Czech Extraliga season.

References

External links

1994 births
Living people
Rytíři Kladno players
Brampton Battalion players
Czech ice hockey centres
People from Beroun District
Sportspeople from the Central Bohemian Region
Czech expatriate ice hockey players in Canada